is a railway station on the Takayama Main Line in the city of  Hida, Gifu Prefecture, Japan, operated by Central Japan Railway Company (JR Central).

Lines

Layout
The station has one ground-level side platform and one island platform, connected by a footbridge. The station has a Midori no Madoguchi staffed ticket office.

Platforms

Adjacent stations

History
The station opened on 25 October 1934. With the privatization of Japanese National Railways (JNR) on 1 April 1987, the station came under the control of JR Central.

Surrounding area

 Hida City Office
 Hida City Library

In popular culture

The station appeared in the 2016 animated film Your Name.

See also
 List of railway stations in Japan

References

External links

Railway stations in Gifu Prefecture
Takayama Main Line
Railway stations in Japan opened in 1934
Stations of Central Japan Railway Company
Hida, Gifu